The 2018 season is SCG Muangthong United Football Club's 12th existence in the new era since they took over from Nongchok Pittaya Nusorn Football Club in 2007. It is the 3rd season in the Thai League and the club's 10th consecutive season in the top flight of the Thai football league system since promoted in the 2009 season.

League by seasons

Competitions

Thai League

Thai FA Cup

Thai League Cup

AFC Champions League

Qualifying play-offs

Squad appearances statistics

Squad goals statistics

Overall summary

Season Summary

Score overview

Transfers
First Thai footballer's market is opening on 14 November 2017 to 5 February 2018
Second Thai footballer's market is opening on 11 June 2018 to 9 July 2018

In

Out

Loan in

Loan out

Notes

References

External links
 SCG Muangthong United F.C. Official Website 
 Thai League Official Website

MTU
2018
2018 in Asian association football leagues